Tugger: The Jeep 4x4 Who Wanted to Fly is a 2005 American direct-to-video movie produced by Genesis Orlando. It is about a Willys Jeep named Tugger (voiced by Jim Belushi) who during World War II is damaged during a battle and his motor fan is replaced by an airplane propeller, giving him a dream of one day flying.

Plot  
"Work in Progress" The opens up to the narrator talking about a Willy 4x4 named Tugger who was badly damaged in battle during WWII, his engine fan was destroyed and replaced with an airplane propeller. After the war, Tugger was put up for sale and was sold to a small airport, where he is closer to his dream to fly like a real plane.

Voices 

Jim Belushi as Tugger
Carrot Top as Shorty
Lance LeGault as The Chief
 Peter Renaday as Pa Pump and the narrator
 Wendy Cutler as Ma Pump
 Jason Jackman as Bob
 Bob Papenbrook as BD
 Gary Bosko as Controller
 Newell Alexander as Doc, Crewman 2
 Michael Sorich as Frank
 Bridget Hoffman as Lucy
 Robert Clotworthy as Fatty and USAF Pilot
 Steve Bulen as Towerman and Crewman 3
 Doug Turkel as Stranger
 Tom Kinney as Max

Release 
Tugger premiered at a few Carmike Theaters nationwide in 2005, however, Jeffery J. Varab, the director of the film, stated that the film was only test screened. It was later released on DVD by Durand Group the same year and again by Anchor Bay Entertainment in 2008.

Reception 
Tugger was not reviewed by many critics, but received mixed reviews from those who did review it. Orlando Sentinel's Roger Moore gave it a 2.5 saying "Tugger: The Jeep Who Wanted to Fly never really takes flight. It's better designed than animated, better voiced than scripted." Asheville, N.C., Mountain Xpress gave it 3 stars calling it boring but with a delightful, crisp, and clever visual.

References

2005 direct-to-video films
2005 films
2000s American animated films
American children's animated films
2000s English-language films